Darkon may refer to:

The Israeli passport (Hebrew: Darkon Yisre'eli)
Darkon, a domain of the Ravenloft campaign in the Advanced Dungeons & Dragons role-playing game
The primary antagonist of Teknoman
The Darkon Wargaming Club, a live-action role-playing group located in the United States
Darkon (film), a film based on the above club
Darkon (unparticle), a hypothetical dark matter field